Shavkat Miromonovich Mirziyoyev (Uzbek Latin: Shavkat Miromonovich (Miromon o‘g‘li) Mirziyoyev, Uzbek Cyrillic: Шавкат Миромонович (Миромон ўғли) Мирзиёев ; born 24 July 1957) is an Uzbek politician who has served as President of Uzbekistan and Supreme Commander-in-Chief of the Armed Forces of Uzbekistan since 2016. Previously he was the Prime Minister of Uzbekistan from 2003 to 2016.

Following the death of President Islam Karimov, he was appointed by the Oliy Majlis as interim president of Uzbekistan on 8 September 2016. He was subsequently elected to a full five-year term as president in the December 2016 presidential election, winning 88.6% of the vote, and was sworn in on 14 December 2016. Mirziyoyev was re-elected to a second term with 80.31% of the vote in the 2021 Uzbek presidential election.

Early life and career
Mirziyoyev was born on 24 July 1957 in the Jizzakh Region of the Uzbek SSR.  Some media outlets alleged that he was really born in the village of Yakhtan in the Leninabad Oblast (now the Sughd Region) of Tajikistan, and even unconfirmed claims that he was allegedly a Tajik. After an investigation by several journalists, it was revealed that Yakhtan is the native home of Mirziyoyev's grandfather on his father's side, and that Mirziyoyev himself is an Uzbek, and not a Tajik. His father, Miromon Mirziyoyevich Mirziyoyev, worked as a physician for most of his life until death. He worked as the head physician of the tuberculosis dispensary in Zaamin. Urunbek Yakubov, a cousin of Miromon, being a veteran of World War II, became a Hero of the Soviet Union in April 1945. Shavkat's mother Marifat, died at a young age from tuberculosis, which she contracted in the Zaamin tuberculosis dispensary, where she worked as a nurse. After the death of his wife, Miromon Mirziyoyev married a second time to a woman from Tatarstan.

In 1981, Mirziyoyev graduated from the Tashkent Institute of Irrigation and Melioration. He holds a Candidate (Ph.D.) degree in Technological Sciences. He joined the Communist Party of the Soviet Union in the late 1980s. In early 1990, he was elected as a deputy of the Supreme Soviet of the Uzbek SSR's last legislative body before the independence of Uzbekistan in 1991. The ceremony took place in the Senate and State Legislative Assembly Building in Tashkent.

Political career 
He served as governor (Hakim) of Jizzakh Region from 1996 to September 2001, then as governor of Samarqand Region from September 2001 until his appointment as prime minister in 2003. He was nominated as prime minister by President Islam Karimov on 12 December 2003, and approved by the Uzbek parliament. He replaced Prime Minister Oʻtkir Sultonov. His deputy was Ergash Shoismatov.

Mirziyoyev and Han Myeong-sook, the Prime Minister of South Korea, met in Tashkent on 25 September 2006. They signed several agreements, including one deal in which Uzbekistan was to send 300 tons of Uzbek uranium ore to South Korea every year from 2010 to 2014. The deal bypasses U.S. companies that acted previously as middlemen for South Korean imports of Uzbek uranium ore. Han also met with President Islam Karimov and parliament speaker Erkin Xalilov. Han and Mirziyoyev boosted cooperation in the energy, agriculture, construction, architecture, and information technology sectors. Trade between South Korea and Uzbekistan increased by nearly 40% between 2005 and 2006, to $565 million.

According to a 2017 report by Human Rights Watch on forced and child labour in the cotton sector of Uzbekistan, during his time as prime minister from 2003 to 2016 Mirziyoyev "oversaw the cotton production system, and as the previous governor of Jizzakh and Samarkand, he was in charge of two cotton-producing regions. The 2016 harvest, when Mirziyoyev was acting president and retained control over cotton production, continued to be defined by mass involuntary mobilization of workers under threat of penalty." The report states that during a 2015 conference call with local authorities and farmers, Mirziyoyev said “Go to the homes of farmers in debt, who can't repay their credit, take their cars, livestock, and if there are none, take the slate from their roofs!”

On 24 October Uzbekistan's Central Election Commission announced that Mirziyoyev received 80.1 percent of the vote and will serve a second five-year term.

Presidency

A member of the Samarkand clan, he was considered to be one of the leading potential successors to Islam Karimov as President of Uzbekistan. Mirziyoyev was reported to have friendly relations with Karimov's wife, Tatyana Karimova, and National Security Council chairman Rustam Inoyatov.

After the death of Karimov was announced on 2 September 2016, Mirziyoyev was appointed as head of the committee organizing the funeral of the President. That was taken as a sign that Mirziyoyev would succeed Karimov as president. On 8 September 2016, he was appointed as interim president of Uzbekistan by a joint session of both houses of parliament. Although the chairman of the Senate, Nigmatilla Yuldashev, was constitutionally designated as Karimov's successor, Yuldashev proposed that Mirziyoyev take the post of interim president instead in light of Mirziyoyev's "many years of experience". There were expectations that Mirziyoyev would repair Uzbek relations with Kyrgyzstan and Tajikistan. He started to settle a long-running border dispute with Kyrgyzstan, and regular flights between the capitals of Uzbekistan and Tajikistan were set to resume in January 2017 for the first time since 1992.

The electoral commission announced on 16 September that Mirziyoyev would stand in the December 2016 presidential election as the candidate of the Liberal Democratic Party.

Mirziyoyev won the election, held on 4 December 2016, with 88.6% of the vote according to official results, defeating three minor candidates. The election was described by The Economist as a sham; the paper wrote that Mirziyoyev's bent was as authoritarian as that of Karimov and that state media claimed the choice was between Mirziyoyev, chaos, or Islamic radicalism. It also claimed that the three opponents were only on the ballot to keep up the appearance of pluralism. The Organization for Security and Co-operation in Europe said the election lacked "a genuine choice," pointing to instances of ballot box stuffing and proxy voting.

On 12 December 2016, Deputy Prime Minister Abdulla Aripov was nominated to take over from Mirziyoyev as prime minister. Mirziyoyev was sworn in as president on 14 December, vowing to "continue the work of my dear teacher, the great statesman Islam Karimov", while also promising "many changes in the cabinet". Aripov was confirmed as prime minister by parliament on the same day; a cabinet reshuffle followed on 15 December. On 6 March 2017, he made a state visit to Turkmenistan; it was his first foreign trip after the election.

In the three months following the death of Islam Karimov, Mirziyoyev began to hint at reforms to longstanding policies that had held back the Uzbek economy and isolated the country internationally, so many analysts believed that Mirziyoyev would be a better president than his predecessor.

However, the German Federal Ministry for Economic Cooperation and Development noted that "The people of Uzbekistan play no part in political decision-making processes. So far, no parliamentary or presidential election held in the post-Soviet era has been considered as either free or fair by the international community... Given the sensitive political situation in Uzbekistan, development cooperation activities there are implemented as far away from government circles as possible." However, the positive results of his rule are visible. Uzbekistan created more than 336,000 new jobs in 2017. The volume of exports increased by almost 15 percent. In 2018, the total financial indicator of exports is expected at 12.1 billion US dollars. He initiated the project of "Tashkent City", intended to attract foreign investors to Uzbekistan. Mirziyoyev promised to resume negotiations with the World Trade Organization (WTO) on joining the organization in 2018. On several occasions, he sharply criticized the administration and officials in the presence of media.

On 22 December, the first time in the country's history, Shavkat Mirziyoyev made an appeal to the parliament. His speech lasted for four hours. He said:

Some analysts think Mirziyoyev wants to enter in history as a reformer. He removed most of Karimov's officials and urged government to employ "new, young people who love their country." After a year in office, Mirziyoyev is increasingly moving away from his predecessor's policy, which is especially visibly in his active foreign policy. He visited all the Uzbek regions and big cities to get acquainted with the implementation of the projects and reforms which he had ordered. Many analysts and Western media compared his rule with Chinese leader Deng Xiaoping or Russian leader Mikhail Gorbachev; his rule has been quoted as being an "Uzbek Spring".

At the end of that year, he was named the "Asian of the Year of 2018" by the Asia Journalist Association (AJA).

In August 2019 he closed the notorious Jaslyk Prison.

In July 2021, Mirziyoyev's spokesperson attempted to generate some suspense as to whether or not the President would run in the elections again. It was widely acknowledged that Mirziyoyev would not only participate but likely win.

On 1 July 2022 protests broke out in the autonomous region of Karakalpakstan over proposed amendments to the Constitution of Uzbekistan which would have ended Karakalpakstan's status as an autonomous region of Uzbekistan and right to secede from Uzbekistan via referendum. They were brutally suppressed, at least 18 people were killed.

Foreign policy

Mirziyoyev's foreign policy is much more open than the policy of his predecessor. Uzbekistan was practically under international isolation after the Andijan massacre in 2005 and Karimov rarely travelled outside of Central Asia and other CIS states. Mirziyoyev promised to conduct an active foreign policy at the beginning of his tenure.

During the first 10 months of his tenure, Mirziyoyev visited Kazakhstan four times, Turkmenistan three times, Russia two times, as well as China, Saudi Arabia, United States, Turkey and Kyrgyzstan. At the different occasions, he met the presidents of Iran, Azerbaijan, Afghanistan, Tajikistan, Bulgaria, Belarus and the King of Spain. During the CIS Summit in Tashkent in November 2017, he met eight Prime Ministers of foreign countries.

One of his most significant foreign policy achievements is the gradual improvement of relations with Kyrgyzstan and Tajikistan. On 5 September 2017, just 3 days after the anniversary of the death of his predecessor, he made a historic visit to Kyrgyzstan. This was the first state visit of an Uzbek president to the neighboring country since 2000. On 19 September 2017, Mirziyoyev addressed the UN General Assembly for the first time.

In 2018, a large number of foreign leaders visited or were expected in Uzbekistan, including Egyptian President Abdel Fattah el-Sisi, Turkish President Recep Tayyip Erdoğan, and Belarusian President Alexander Lukashenko, whose visit took place in September and was his first state visit to the country in 24 years. In March 2018, Mirziyoyev made a visit to Tajikistan, which made him the first Uzbek president to conduct a state visit to Dushanbe since 2000.

Mirziyoyev has also taken an important role in Afghanistan by offering to host peace talks between the government and the Taliban since March 2018. During the week of 6–10 August 2018, a Taliban delegation visited Tashkent, at the request of Mirziyoyev, to discuss issues including transport, power and peace in Afghanistan. Mirziyoyev attended the Vibrant Gujarat international investment summit as a key guest, being the first Central Asian leader to participate as a partner in the summit. In early 2019, it was announced that Mirziyoyev planned to visit 36 countries in official visits throughout the year.

In March 2019, Mirziyoyev held a telephone conversation with Nursultan Nazarbayev, who had resigned from office that day. In it, he expressed regret to the ex-president, saying that he was a "great politician". During a visit to Abu Dhabi in March 2019, Mirziyoyev came away from his talks with Crown Prince Mohammed bin Zayed with over $10 billion in infrastructure, alternative energy and agriculture deals, as well as deals in other spheres.

In 2022 Uzbekistan hosted the 22nd Shanghai Cooperation Organization Summit in Samarkand. During the summit, which was attended by world leaders Turkish President Recep Tayyip Erdogan, Russian President Vladimir Putin, Chinese President Xi Jinping, Iran's Ebrahim Raisi, Azerbaijan's Ilham Aliyev, presidents of Uzbekistan, Tajikistan, Kyrgyzstan, and Mongolia, and the prime ministers of Pakistan and India, it was noted that the Chinese and Indian leaders chastised President Putin about his role in Ukraine.  In preparation for the Summit, the president ordered that the city be redeveloped. This included the construction of a new international airport and a tourism complex that has had mixed reviews.

Culture policy
In October 2020, Mirziyoyev issued a decree to accelerate the full Latinization of the Uzbek language that outlined language policy for the 2020–30 period as the country continues an on-again, off-again attempt to reform the Uzbek language and widen its use. Some of the main parts of the degree called on the development of a road map for a full transition to the Uzbek alphabet based on the Latin alphabet, as well as government officials by April 2021 to be certified in their knowledge of Uzbek.

Personal life
He has two sisters, a half-brother, and sister. Mirziyoyev is married to Ziroatkhon Hoshimova and has two daughters, a son and five grandchildren. The eldest daughter of Said Mirziyoyev heads the sector for communications and information policy of the executive office of the administration of the head of state. His eldest son-in-law, Oybek Tursunov, is the current head of Mirziyoyev's presidential administration, while his younger son-in-law, Otabek Shahanov, is the head of the presidential security services.

Since coming to power, Mirziyoyev has built a new residence for himself in Qibray District, which could potentially include a presidential highway, and an interior that is decorated with Argentinian marble slabs and Swarovski crystals.

In February 2021, it was reported that Mirziyoyev was building an exclusive mountain compound, including a new reservoir. The compound, located about 100 kilometers by car from Tashkent, includes a luxurious mansion built for Mirziyoyev and his relatives. Two sources estimated the cost of the development at several hundred million dollars, though only a handful of publicly available official documents make reference to the compound and the adjacent reservoir, which were largely completed by 2019.

Awards 
 Order "Mehnat shuhrati"
 Order "Fidokorona xizmatlari uchun"
  (Kyrgyzstan, 22 November 2017)
 Honored Citizen of Seoul (South Korea, 14 April 2018)
 Prize “For Merits to Eurasia” (Turkey, 24 April 2018)
Order of Friendship (Kazakhstan, 15 March 2018)
Order of the Crown (Tajikistan, 10 June 2021)
Honorary Doctorate from Nagoya University (Japan, 8 July 2022)
 Order of Alexander Nevsky (Russia, 24 July 2022)

References

External links

Government of Uzbekist'on Official Website
Жаноб Президент, a 2018 documentary on Mirziyoyev commissioned by the Press Service of the president of Uzbekistan
Official account in Instagram

|-

1957 births
Living people
People from Jizzakh Region
Presidents of Uzbekistan
Prime Ministers of Uzbekistan
Shavkat Mirziyoev
Self-Sacrifice National Democratic Party politicians
Uzbekistan Liberal Democratic Party politicians
Uzbekistan National Revival Democratic Party politicians
Recipients of the Order of Alexander Nevsky
Chairmen of the Organization of Turkic States
Uzbekistani Muslims